Jack Sanders (born October 9, 1958) is an American former ice sledge hockey player. He won a gold medal with Team USA as a defenseman at the 2002 Winter Paralympics.
Currently, he is a player/coach for Central Illinois Thunder.

References

1958 births
Living people
People from Galesburg, Illinois
Paralympic sledge hockey players of the United States
American sledge hockey players
Paralympic gold medalists for the United States
Medalists at the 2002 Winter Paralympics
Paralympic medalists in sledge hockey
Ice sledge hockey players at the 2002 Winter Paralympics